Teng Nong khon maha hia ( or Teng and Nong: The Movie) is a 2007 Thai comedy film directed by and starring Thai television comedians Pongsak Pongsuwan and Choosak Iamsook.

On its release, despite negative reviews by film critics, the film was No. 1 at Thailand cinema box offices, topping such Hollywood films as Shrek the Third, Ocean's Thirteen and another Thai film, Ploy.

Plot
Bumbling parking valets Nong (Choosak Iamsuk) and Teng (Pongsak Pongsuwan) are assigned by their gangster boss (Phairoj Jaising) to deliver a valuable Chinese statuette to another gangster boss Hia See (Andy Khemphimook). During the journey, they decide to take a side trip and what should have been a simple job turns into a major fiasco with a police chase led by Lt Namtarn (Jirada Yohara).

References

External links
 Official site

2007 films
2007 comedy films
Thai-language films
Gangster films
Sahamongkol Film International films
Thai comedy films
2007 directorial debut films